Hounslow Women Football Club is an English football club based in London. The club was founded from a merger of Wembley Mill Hill F.C. and QPR Women F.C. in May 2001. The club was formerly known as QPR Women F.C until June 2018.

It was known as Queens Park Rangers Ladies Football Club from the merger until a name change in June 2018 to Queens Park Rangers Women Football Club. 

The Main club made the decision to form its own new women's team for the start of the 2019/20 season which it named QPR FC Women who currently play their football in the London and South East Women's Regional Football League. The old Queens Park Rangers Women FC who were not under the umbrella of the football club at the time then made the decision to change their name to Hounslow Women FC with effect from the 2019/20 season and currently continue to play in the FA Women's National League.

Current squad

Former players

Honours

South East Combination Women's Football League
Winners: 2013–14
Runners-up: 2002–03

Middlesex County FA Women's Senior Cup
Winners: 2009–10
Finalists: 2001–02, 2002–03, 2004–05, 2010–11

South West Combination League Cup
Winners: 2006–07

References

 

Association football clubs established in 2001
Queens Park Rangers F.C.
Women's football clubs in England
2001 establishments in England
FA Women's National League teams